Hahira Middle School is a public school in the Lowndes County district, Hahira, Georgia, United States. It serves grades 6 - 8.

Background
The school's principal is Dr. Ivy Smith.

In 2007 it achieved the School of Excellence Award and in 2009 it was named one of Georgia's "Lighthouse Schools to Watch."

The student to teacher ratio is 16:1.

Athletics
Hahira Middle School plays athletics with the South Georgia Athletic Conference. They play against other southwest Georgia middle schools, including:

Valdosta Middle School
Newbern Middle School (Valdosta)
Eighth Street Middle School (Tift)
Pine Grove Middle School (Lowndes)
Lowndes Middle School
Coffee Middle School
C.A. Gray Jr. High School (Colquitt)
Williams Middle School (Colquitt)

Hahira Middle has baseball and softball fields on the site of the Old Hahira High School, dedicated in honor of the Drew brothers.

Notable alumni
J. D. Drew, professional baseball player
Stephen Drew, professional baseball player
Tim Drew, professional baseball player

References

External links
 

Public middle schools in Georgia (U.S. state)
Schools in Lowndes County, Georgia